Billy Reid may refer to:

Sports

Association football
Billy Reid (footballer, 1938–2021), Scottish footballer
Billy Reid (footballer, born 1963), Scottish football player and manager
Billy Reid (footballer, born 1986), his son, Scottish footballer who played for Clyde

Other sports
Billy Reid (baseball) (1857–1940), Canadian baseball player
Billy Reid (basketball) (born 1957), American professional player

Others
Billy Reid (British songwriter) (1902–1974), British orchestra leader and songwriter
Billy Reid (Canadian songwriter) (born 1977), Canadian television and podcasting personality
Billy Reid (fashion designer) (born 1964), American, born in Louisiana
Billy Reid (Irish republican) (1939–1971), member of the Provisional Irish Republican Army
Billy Edwin Reid (born 1959), American suspected serial killer

See also
William Reid (disambiguation)
Billy Reed (1928–2003), footballer
Billy Reed (baseball) (1922–2005), American Major League Baseball player